Meelis is an Estonian masculine given name. The feminine form of Meelis is Meeli.

People named Meelis include:

Meelis Aasmäe (born 1972), cross-country skier
Meelis Atonen (born 1966), entrepreneur and politician
Meelis Friedenthal (born 1973), fantasy writer and theologian
Meelis Hainsoo (born 1972; also known as Hainz), singer (:et)
Meelis Kanep (born 1983), chess grandmaster
Meelis Kivisild (bor 1990), volleyball player
Meelis Kiili (born 1965), Brigadier General
Meelis Kompus (born 1980), radio and TV journalist
Meelis Kubo (born 1982), magician
Meelis Lao (born 1966), businessman
Meelis Lindmaa (born 1970), football player
Meelis Loit (born 1971), fencer and Olympic competitor
Meelis Mälberg (born 1970), politician
Meelis Mandel (born 1971), journalist (:et)
Meelis Muhu (born 1972), documentary film director, producer and actor
Meelis Paavel (born 1963), economic geographer and politician
Meelis Pai (born 1968), theatre leader and theatre producer
Meelis Peitre (born 1990), football player
Meelis Rämmeld (born 1971), actor
Meelis Rooba (born 1977), football player
Meelis Veilberg (born 1961), long-distance runner
 (born 1964), composer and clarinetist

Fictional characters
Meelis, the main character from Enn Kippel's 1941 novel Meelis

References

Estonian masculine given names